Phil Wickham is the debut commercial album recorded by American Christian and worship music singer Phil Wickham, released on April 25, 2006.

Critical reception

Phil Wickham has received generally positive reviews from most music critics.

"The lyrics are vertical in nature, with the majority of the tracks being completely acoustic, stripped and raw with little or no help from BGVs. But perhaps that is what makes this debut so inviting. The ease with which the emotive lyrics drip off Wickham's tongue really draws the listener in." '-Lindsay Williams from CCM Magazine

"...virtually every song builds from humble acoustic beginnings to a cymbal-crashing climax. While this might seem exciting, rather it elicits a "sameness" that brings a somnolent quality to the whole album." -Paul Schultz from The Trades

"His lyrical dexterity is solid throughout the mix of acoustic ballads and sonic rockers; likewise, he manages to inject a deep sense of intimacy in either groove... He uses strings to perfection to add an atmospheric quality to many tracks, and the effect is only magnified with his richly layered arrangements and passionate delivery" -Christian Music About

"I wouldn't be surprised if Phil had just pressed record on a tape recorder, gotten lost in the beauty of prayer, and found in playback God was really leading Him to the lyrics for this record, that's how freeflowing the CD is, the tracks continue each other, building upon thoughts, longing, and maintaining confidence of God's Word by trusting Him with your life. An excellent view of worship from the honesty of a heart flooded with grace." -Soul Shine

"Every song on the record is an adventure, which made making the record an unforgettable experience" Kipley says. "Phil has such an incredible sense of melody, lyrics that read like poetry, and I believe the listener will leave with feelings of the greatness of God, and at the same time the desire for God to have an intimate relationship with us."

"With his influences dating back to his parents' tenure as a part of the Jesus Movement in bands The Way and Parable and with tunes reminiscent of Coldplay, there's a beautiful simplicity that makes Wickham's album truly unique." -CCM Magazine.

"I guess Phil Wickham from San Diego grew up listening to some of the artists I mentioned, he is also inspired by the modern singer/songwriter style where John Mayer comes in mind." -Melodic.net

"Phil Wickham combines a west coast ethic that channels the pop sensibilities of Coldplay with the emotive lyrics of singer songwriters like John Mayer."

"Shades of Sixpence None the Richer's genius mixed with Coldplay's melancholy charms, Wickham's music is lavishly poetic and compelling." -Christian Music About

"His vocal vibratos remind me of Jeff Buckley, but Wickham is more controlled, less improvisational than Buckley." -Soul Shine

"... for its modern-sounding melody woven with Wickham's soaring vocals, which are reminiscent of mainstream acts like Jeff Buckley and Travis." -SongTouch.com

Track listing

The lead single, "Grace", received positive reviews from critics.

Personnel

 Phil Wickham – vocals acoustic guitar, electric guitar, baritone guitar, banjo, acoustic piano
 Chris Donahue – bass
 Elijah Thomson – bass
 Brandon Lozano – drums 
 Roy G. Biv String Vibe – strings
 Vlade Flemingovoch – concertmaster 

Production
 Pete Kipley – producer
 Mike "X" O'Connor – recording
 Steve Lotz – recording assistant 
 F. Reid Shippen – mixing 
 Andrew Mendelson – mastering
 BrickHouse Entertainment – management 
 Recorded and Mixed at The Groove Masters (Nashville, Tennessee).
 Mastered at Georgetown Masters (Nashville, Tennessee).

References

2006 debut albums
INO Records albums
Phil Wickham albums